La Monja Island (also Monja Island; Spanish: "the nun") is a small, uninhabited island near the entrance to Manila Bay in the Philippines. It has remained untouched compared to other nearby islands, which have been used as military installations over the past four centuries.

History
On 18 May 2012, a pilot and co-pilot were killed when an Aermacchi SF.260 plane belonging to the Philippine Air Force crashed close to the island.

See also

 List of islands in the Greater Manila Area
 List of islands of the Philippines
 List of islands
 Desert island

References

Islands of Manila Bay
Uninhabited islands of the Philippines
Islands of Cavite
Cavite City